Manjeev Singh Puri (Punjabi: ਮੰਜੀਵ ਸਿੰਘ ਪੁਰੀ) is a retired Indian civil servant of the Indian Foreign Service cadre and the former Ambassador of India to Nepal.

Education
He has an MBA and did his B.A. (Honours) in Economics from St. Stephen's College, Delhi

Diplomatic career
Manjeev Singh Puri joined the Indian Foreign Service in the year 1982 and in the course of his diplomatic career spanning over 36 years, he has served in different capacity in Indian Missions abroad and in the India's Foreign Ministry including a number of multilateral organizations such as the United Nations, European Union etc.

In Delhi, he has served as Joint Secretary (UN- Economic & Social) and Deputy Chief of Protocol in the India's Foreign Ministry. Prior to becoming India's Ambassador to Nepal, he has served as Ambassador of India in Brussels from 2014-2017 and as Ambassador and Deputy Permanent Representative of India to the UN in New York from 2009 to 2013.

Personal life
He serves on the advisory board of The Energy and Resources Institute. He is married to Ms. Namrita and has one daughter and one son.

See also
Harsh Vardhan Shringla
Vijay Gokhale
Navtej Sarna
Taranjit Singh Sandhu
Pankaj Saran
Riva Ganguly Das
Dr. Subrahmanyam Jaishankar

References

1959 births
Living people
People from Punjab, India
Indian diplomats
Indian Foreign Service officers
Ambassadors of India to the European Union
Ambassadors of India to Belgium
Ambassadors of India to Luxembourg
Ambassadors of India to Nepal